Psychology and Developing Societies (PDS) is a peer reviewed journal.  It serves as a forum for discussion for psychologists from different parts of the world concerned with the problems of developing societies. In pursuit of that aim, the journal especially encourages articles which reflect the unique sociocultural and historical experience of developing countries and provide alternative paradigms, indigenous concepts and methods which have relevance for social policy in these countries. It is published twice a year by SAGE Publishing.

Abstracting and indexing 
Psychology and Developing Societies is abstracted and indexed in:
 ProQuest: International Bibliography of the Social Sciences (IBSS)
 SCOPUS
 Research Papers in Economics
 DeepDyve
 Portico
 Dutch-KB
 Pro-Quest-RSP
 EBSCO
 OCLC
 Ohio
 ICI
 ProQuest-Illustrata
 PsycINFO
 J-Gate

References

External links
 
 Homepage

SAGE Publishing academic journals
Psychology journals
Development studies journals
Publications established in 1989